Aikawa Hiroki (愛川 ヒロキ) is a male Japanese popular music artist and composer. He was born in Iwaki City, Fukushima Prefecture on June 24, 1963. He made his debut with the band remote on 1988. After "remote" broke up, he wrote songs for other artists as well as playing for various artists.  Currently, he is also working as a member of the band The Bean'S he created himself.

Works

By Artists
 Don't Worry! 4L
 a abel
 Feinto Gachine Chiba Mika
 CANDY DOLL Emina Mako
 Muga HOLY NOIZ
 MiYOU Ikeda Kizoku
 I WISH Kirino Kanna
 innocence Kuno Sayaka
 NO Kamiyama Minori
 MIDNIGHT BLUE Mita Airi
 SECRET HEART MODE
 Kizu, Shinjitsu Natsuko
 EL AMOR Noah
 Yojo Robotomi
 Kurutta Tokei Shudo Kaori
 HOTMILK Takeda Aika

External links
 Notorious : H.Aikawa Official Web Site

References

Year of birth missing (living people)
Japanese pop musicians
Japanese songwriters
Living people